In model theory, a first-order theory is called model complete if every embedding of its models is an elementary embedding. 
Equivalently, every first-order formula is equivalent to a universal formula.
This notion was introduced by Abraham Robinson.

Model companion and model completion

A companion of  a theory T is a  theory T* such that every model of T can be embedded in a model of  T* and vice versa.

A model companion of a theory T is a companion of T that is model complete. Robinson proved that a theory has at most one model companion. Not every theory is model-companionable, e.g. theory of groups. However if T is an -categorical theory, then it always has a model companion.

A model completion for a theory T is a model companion T* such that for any model M of T, the theory of T* together with the diagram of M is complete. Roughly speaking, this means every model of T is embeddable in a model of T* in a unique way.

If  T* is a model companion of T  then the following conditions are equivalent:
 T* is a model completion of T
 T has the amalgamation property.

If T also has universal axiomatization, both of the above are also equivalent to:
 T* has elimination of quantifiers

Examples

Any theory with elimination of quantifiers is model complete.
The theory of algebraically closed fields is the model completion of the theory of fields. It is model complete but not complete.
The model completion of the theory of equivalence relations is the theory of equivalence relations with infinitely many equivalence classes, each containing an infinite number of elements.
 The theory of real closed fields, in the language of ordered rings, is a model completion of the theory of ordered fields (or even ordered domains). 
The theory of real closed fields, in the language of rings, is the model companion for the theory of formally real fields, but is not a model completion.

Non-examples

The theory of dense linear orders with a first and last element is complete but not model complete.
The theory of groups (in a language with symbols for the identity, product, and inverses) has the amalgamation property but does not have a model companion.

Sufficient condition for completeness of model-complete theories

If T is a model complete theory and there is a model of T that embeds into any model of T, then T is complete.

Notes

References

 
 

Mathematical logic
Model theory